A national list member of parliament (national list MP) is a nominated member of parliament who is appointed by a political party or an independent group to the Parliament of Sri Lanka. The number of national list MPs allocated to a contesting party or an independent group depends on the proportion to their share of the national vote. A total of 29 national list MPs are appointed alongside 196 elected MPs (elected from 22 multi-member electoral districts) making a total of 225 members in the parliament.

History
Following the establishment of the Senate and the House of Representatives in Ceylon under the Soulbury Commission, the House of Representatives had six members appointed by the Governor-General, on the advice of the Prime Minister to represent important interests which were not represented or inadequately represented in the House, they were usually from the European and Burgher communities and on occasions from the Indian Tamils and Muslim (Moors or Malays) groups. On a few occasions caste groups from within the Sinhalese and Tamils also obtained representation in Parliament as appointed members. In the Senate, 15 members were elected by the lower chamber, the House of Representatives and the other 15 members were appointed by the Governor-General on advice of the Prime Minister and generally consisted of distinguished individuals. The senators were known as "Elected Senators" and "Appointed Senators" respectively. The Senate was abolished in 1971. During the 2022 Sri Lankan political crisis, national list MP Ranil Wickremesinghe was appointed Prime Minister by President Gotabaya Rajapaksa and weeks later succeeded Rajapaksa as President  of Sri Lanka, after Rajapaksa fled the country and resigned.

Current national list MPs
All Ceylon Tamil Congress
 Selvarasa Gajenthiran

Illankai Tamil Arasu Kachchi
 Thavaraja Kalai Arasan

Jathika Jana Balawegaya
 Harini Amarasuriya

Our Power of People's Party
Athuraliye Rathana Thero

Samagi Jana Balawegaya
Harin Fernando
Tissa Attanayake
Ranjith Madduma Bandara
Mayantha Dissanayake
Eran Wickramaratne
Imthiaz Bakeer Markar
Diana Gamage

Sri Lanka Podujana Peramuna
 G. L. Peiris
 Sagara Kariyawasam
 Ali Sabry
 Jayantha Weerasinghe
 Manjula Dissanayake
 Ranjith Bandara
 Charitha Herath
 Gevindu Kumaratunga
 A. J. M. Muzammil
 Tissa Vitharana
 Yadamini Gunawardena
 Suren Raghavan
 Tiran Alles
 Seetha Arambepola
 Jayantha Ketagoda
 Marjan Faleel

Tamil National Alliance
 Shanthi Sriskantharajah
 K. Thurairetnasingam

United National Party
 Vajira Abeywardena

See also
Senate of Ceylon

References

Electoral districts of Sri Lanka
Parliament of Sri Lanka